The Reverend Thomas James Stretch (17 January 1915 – 12 October 1973) was one of the first people to enter the Bergen-Belsen concentration camp when it was liberated by British troops in 1945.  He commented that never in his life had he seen such damnable ghastliness.

Biography
T. J. Stretch was born in Goodwick, Pembrokeshire in Wales on 17 January 1915; his father was Thomas George Stretch, a dock porter. He attended Fishguard County Secondary School (now Ysgol Bro Gwaun) before commencing studies at St. David's College, Lampeter in October 1934.  He worked as priest at Holy Trinity Church, Aberystwyth and as army chaplain with 10 Garrison Detachment (Military Government) As the first army chaplain to enter Bergen-Belsen, he distributed food and clothing to the survivors, and helped bury 20 000 dead.  Following the war, Stretch returned to parochial ministry.  He served first at Chatburn, before moving on to Preston and then Poulton le Fylde, Lancashire; he died at Lytham, Lancashire.

References

External links
 Thomas James Stretch at the United States Holocaust Memorial Museum

1915 births
1973 deaths
Alumni of the University of Wales
Bergen-Belsen concentration camp
World War II chaplains
British Army personnel of World War II
Welsh military personnel